Murari the Mad Gentleman is an Indian Hindi-language comedy film directed by Suzad Iqbal Khan and starring Asrani, Sanjay Singh, Nataliya Illina, Kiran Sharad, and Surendra Rajan. The film was released on 6 May 2016.

Cast 
 Sanjay Singh as Murari
 Asrani as Mukhiya
 Natalya Llina  as American girl Jenny
 Surendra Rajan as dadu
 Kiran Sharad as Mohini

Music 

Murari The Mad Gentleman has four tracks. The album includes five songs, the first song "Raabta" sung by Sonu Nigam is a soothing melody with sentimental lyrics, second song "Tera Deewana" is a romantic number with Hindi & English lyrics, third song "Shabbo" is an item number sung by Mamta Sharma, 4th and 5th song i.e. "Udi Udi" and "Udi Udi Duet" sung by Krishna Beura, Shahid Mallya & Khushboo Jain respectively are happy mood romantic songs. Music is beautifully Composed by Biswajit Bhattacharjee ‘Bibo’ and lyrics by Krishan Bhardwaj.

References

External links 

Murari the Mad Gentleman at BollywoodTrade.com

2016 films
2010s Hindi-language films
Indian comedy films
2016 comedy films